Tongu-ike dam is an earthfill dam located in Shiga prefecture in Japan. The dam is used for irrigation. The catchment area of the dam is 0.9 km2. The dam impounds about 2  ha of land when full and can store 320 thousand cubic meters of water. The construction of the dam was completed in 1965.

References

Dams in Shiga Prefecture
1965 establishments in Japan